Little Cedar Lake (or Petit lac des Cèdres) is a 2.5 mile-long lake located in Messines, Quebec, 90 minutes from Ottawa. Recreational activities include swimming, fishing and watersports. It is a very shallow and sandy area in parts, but is 120 feet deep in spots with crystal clean water, with lake trout sitting around 80 feet in the summer. There is also bass and pike fishing. It's so big!

References

See also
 List of lakes in Canada

Lakes of Outaouais